Petrykozy may refer to the following places:
Petrykozy, Opoczno County in Łódź Voivodeship (central Poland)
Petrykozy, Pabianice County in Łódź Voivodeship (central Poland)
Petrykozy, Grodzisk Mazowiecki County in Masovian Voivodeship (east-central Poland)
Petrykozy, Sierpc County in Masovian Voivodeship (east-central Poland)
Petrykozy, Warmian-Masurian Voivodeship (north Poland)
Petrykozy, West Pomeranian Voivodeship (north-west Poland)